Chládek (feminine Chládková) is a Czech surname derived from the Czech word chlád, meaning "coolness." Possibly a nickname for a reserved person. Notable people include:

 Dana Chladek, Czech-American kayaker
 Denisa Chládková, Czech tennis player
 František Chládek, Czech biathlete
 Marcel Chládek, Czech politician
 Patrícia Chládeková, Slovak footballer
 Zdeněk Chládek, Czech boxer

Czech-language surnames